Heworth may refer to:

 Heworth, York
 Heworth A.R.L.F.C., a rugby league club
 Heworth, Tyne and Wear